Photius served as Greek Patriarch of Alexandria between 1900 and 1925. He opposed reform to change from the Julian calendar to the Gregorian calendar. He died in Zürich.

References
General

Specific

20th-century Greek Patriarchs of Alexandria
Year of death missing
Year of birth unknown